The Tony Awards for Best Sound Design of a Play and Best Sound Design of a Musical recognize excellence in sound design for Broadway theatre. They were first given in the 2007–2008 season. In 2014, the Tony Awards Administration Committee announced that starting with the 2014–2015 season the Tony Awards for Best Sound Design of a Play and of a Musical would be eliminated. In 2017, the committee announced that the two Sound Design awards would again be presented starting in the 2017–2018 season.

Best Sound Design of a Play

2000s

2010s

2020s

Best Sound Design of a Musical

2000s

2010s

2020s

Award records

Multiple wins
 2 Wins
Gareth Fry
Brian Ronan

Multiple nominations

 8 Nominations
 Peter Hylenski

 5 Nominations
 Acme Sound Partners
 Scott Lehrer
 Dan Moses Schreier

 4 Nominations
 Paul Arditti
 Simon Baker
 Adam Cork
 Ian Dickinson

 3 Nominations
 Steve Canyon Kennedy
 Gareth Owen
 Nevin Steinberg

 2 Nominations
 Jonathan Deans
 Kai Harada
 Daniel Kluger
 Drew Levy
 Nick Powell
 Leon Rothenberg

Historic nominations & wins 
2011: Acme Sound Partners and Cricket S. Myers – Bengal Tiger at the Baghdad Zoo

 Cricket S. Myers is the first woman to receive a Tony nomination for Sound Design of a Play. 

2019: Nevin Steinberg and Jessica Paz – Hadestown

 Jessica Paz is the first woman to receive a Tony nomination for Sound Design of a Musical and the first woman to win a Tony Award for Sound Design.

See also
Tony Award

References

External links
Tony Awards official website

Tony Awards
Theatrical sound production
Awards established in 2008
2008 establishments in the United States